San Estevan may refer to:
 San Estevan (Maya site), an archaeological site located in northern Belize
 San Estevan, Belize, a village in Orange Walk District, Belize